Meydan-e Sofla (also Romanized as Meydān-e Soflá; also known as Meydān-e Pā'īn) is a village in Dizaj Rural District, in the Central District of Khoy County, West Azerbaijan Province, Iran. At the 2006 census, its population was 164, in 36 families.

References 

Populated places in Khoy County